A Singapore Sling is a tax avoidance scheme in which a large multinational company sells products to a subsidiary owned by them in a jurisdiction with lower tax rates, which acts as a 'marketing hub'. The subsidiary then sells the product to end users, marking up its value and attributing the mark-up to various marketing activities undertaken by the subsidiary. The parent company retains a higher profit margin due to the lower tax rate.  Singapore is a popular location of such subsidiaries, given its low tax rates and its willingness to grant large multinationals 'sweetheart deals' – an extremely low tax rate in exchange for locating the multinational's marketing activities in Singapore.

It is currently under investigation as an abusive practice in Australia.

See also

 Tax exporting
 Tax inversion
 Double Irish
 Dutch Sandwich 
 Bermuda Black Hole
 K2

References

Tax avoidance